Wyoming Highway 332 (WYO 332) is a  north-south state highway in central Sheridan County, Wyoming United States, that connects U.S. Route 87 (US 87) and Wyoming Highway 335 (WYO 335), south of Sheridan, with Interstate 90 Business Loop I-90 BL)/U.S. Route 14 (US 14)/US 87 (South Main Street) in Sheridan.

Route description
WYO 335 begins its southern end just south of Sheridan at an intersection with US 87 and the northern terminus of WYO 335. WYO 332 heads north, named Big Horn Avenue, and roughly parallels US 87 on its way into Sheridan. Passing east of the Sheridan County Airport, WYO 332 intersects the western terminus of Wyoming Highway 334 (E. Brundage Ln.) at 3.8 miles before intersecting the eastern terminus of Wyoming Highway 333 (Airport Rd.) at just over 4 miles which provides access to the airport. One mile north, WYO 332 turns east for one block onto W. College Avenue and then turns north onto S. Main Street to finish its routing. Highway 332 reaches its northern terminus at an intersection with I-90 BL/US 14/US 87.

Major intersections

See also

 List of state highways in Wyoming

References

External links

 Wyoming State Routes 300-399

Transportation in Sheridan County, Wyoming
332